Alev Alev is a Turkish drama television series directed by Ahmet Katıksız and written by Burcu Görgün Toptaş and Damla Serim. Alev Alev premiered on Show TV in November 5, 2020 and it is remake of Le Bazar de la Charité, a French miniseries. starring Demet Evgar, Hazar Ergüçlü and Dilan Çiçek Deniz in the lead roles.

Plot 
The series tells the story of three women, Cemre, Çiçek and Rüya whose lives change after a fire breaks out during a charity party, but with more focus on the life of Cemre, who is married to Çelebi Kayabeyli, the former mayor, she is subjected to violence and injustice, and her husband claims that she is mentally ill, and that she has tried to commit suicide. And he uses his clout to prevent the lawyers from taking over the divorce case that she wants to file against him, as well as threatening to take her child out of the country if she is not silent on her rights.

Cast 
 Demet Evgar as Cemre Akınsel
 Hazar Ergüçlü as Çiçek Görgülü
 Dilan Çiçek Deniz as Rüya Yıldırımlar  Atayci 
 Zuhal Olcay as Tomris Üstünoğlu
 Berkay Ateş as Ozan Akınsel
 Cihangir Ceyhan as Ömer Ataycı
 Cem Bender as Çelebi Kayabeyli
 Berker Güven as İskender Kayabeyli
 Yiğit Sertdemir as Korkut Toprakoğlu
 Meltem Keskin as Seher Akınsel
 Sekvan Serinkaya as Adnan
 Kayra Orta as Güneş
 Kaan Şener as Atlas
 Fatih Çetinbaş as Taner Güvenbağ
 Veda Yurtsever as Hanım
 Bülent Düzgünoğlu as Hikmet
 Gökşen Ateş as Arzu
 Bedia Ener as İsmet
 Sahra Şaş as Zeyno
 Bora Cengiz as Serkan

References 

2020 Turkish television series debuts
Turkish drama television series
Serial drama television series
Television shows set in Istanbul
Television series produced in Istanbul
Television series set in the 2020s